A list of films produced in Russia in 1999 (see 1999 in film).

1999

See also
 1999 in Russia

External links

1999
Russia
Films